M. magnifica may refer to:
 Mitra magnifica, a sea snail species
 Myristica magnifica, a plant species endemic to India